Łódź Stoki is a commuter station located in the city of Łódź, in Widzew district, on a circular line between Łódź Widzew and Zgierz stations. Initially opened in 1973, it was relocated and built from scratch in 2014 as part of Łódź Commuter Railway project, to provide accessibility to nearby medical center and academic estates.

References 

Railway stations in Poland opened in 1973
Stoki
Railway stations served by Łódzka Kolej Aglomeracyjna